Tinychat is an online chat website that allows users to communicate via instant messaging, voice chat, and video chat. It offers instant opportunities for people to meet and the ability for users to create their own virtual chat room on any topic or category. Tinychat is a web-based platform that works on HTML5 compatible browsers or standalone apps for Android or iOS. The chat rooms can contain a rolling maximum of 12 video and audio feeds. Tinychat, including all of its services, is owned by PeerStream.

History
On November 16, 2009, Tinychat launched Tinychat.tv, which offers users the ability to live stream any video or show hosted on Tinychat. The service uses Tinychat's API and provides the ability to launch a personalized page and channel for initiating multi-user shows. Tinychat has also announced that it will not charge for the cost of bandwidth. Based upon restrictions, Tinychat.tv has been closed.

In February 2010, Tinychat launched Tinychat Next, a service similar to Chatroulette. Tinychat Next differs from Chatroulette with the addition of topic-based rooms.

In January 2011, Tinychat raised $1.5 million in funding.

In December 2014, Tinychat was acquired by Paltalk. Paltalk stated that Tinychat would remain a standalone application.

In late 2017, Tinychat revamped its entire website layout. It incorporated a WebRTC version of its chat rooms to replace its older RTMP flash-based chat rooms. The site also added HD video streaming, along with Android/iOS mobile device streaming with compatible devices, via the Tinychat application.

See also
 Paltalk
 Camfrog
 Stickam
 Chatroulette
 Omegle

References

External links 
 

Internet properties established in 2009
Online chat
Instant messaging
Chat websites
Social media companies of the United States